St. Mary's English High School is a co-ed school located in Jamshedpur, Jharkhand, India. The school was established in 1949. It is a secondary level CBSE based school. This school is for L.K.G.to XII standard. The school is equipped with faculty, library, playground, auditorium, computer lab, physics and chemistry lab.

See also
Education in India
Literacy in India
List of schools in India

References

External links 
 

High schools and secondary schools in Jharkhand
Education in Jamshedpur
Educational institutions established in 1949
1949 establishments in India